The 2nd Race of Champions was a non-Championship motor race, run to Formula One rules, held on 12 March 1967 at Brands Hatch circuit in Kent, England. The race was run over two heats of 10 laps of the circuit, then a final of 40 laps, and was won overall by Dan Gurney in an Eagle Mk1.

The grid positions for the first heat were decided by a qualifying session, and the grid for the second heat was determined by the finishing order of the first heat. Similarly, the finishing order for the second heat decided the grid order for the final, although some positions were apparently changed.

Gurney won both heats and the final, taking fastest lap in both heats. The fastest lap of the final was driven by Jack Brabham, although it was slower than Gurney's laps in the heats.

Results

Heat 1

Heat 2

Final

 Jochen Rindt was entered in a Cooper T81B which he used in the heats, and he used Guy Ligier's T81 for the final.
 As well as his Lotus-BRM, Chris Irwin was entered in a Lola-BMW which was not used.

References 
 Results at Silhouet.com 
 Results at F1 Images.de 
 Results at mmmsport 

Race of Champions
Race of Champions (Brands Hatch)
Gold
March 1967 sports events in the United Kingdom